Mehdi Ben Sadok Nafti (born 28 November 1978) is a Tunisian football manager and former player.

Nafti played as a defensive midfielder for Toulouse, Racing Santander, Birmingham City, Aris, Valladolid, Murcia and Cádiz. He was born in France, and won 46 caps for Tunisia, representing the nation at the 2006 World Cup and three Africa Cup of Nations tournaments.

After retiring as a player he went into coaching, working mainly in Spain. He managed Lugo, Leganés and Levante in the Segunda División.

Playing career

Club
Born in Toulouse, France, Nafti made his professional debut with his hometown club, Toulouse FC. He was used sparingly during a three-year spell, and also played several games with the reserves. His best season was 1999–2000, as he appeared in 13 games and scored once to help the team return to Ligue 1 after one year of absence.

In summer 2000, Nafti joined Racing de Santander in La Liga and, as in his previous club, started his stint appearing for the B-team. In the 2000–01 season he played in just three games for the main squad, which was eventually relegated, then proceeded to become a very important midfield element for the Cantabrians in the following three years, whilst collecting 41 yellow cards and three red.

Nafti was signed on loan by Birmingham City in the final minutes of the January 2005 transfer window, making his Premier League debut on 5 February in a 2–0 loss away to Manchester United in which he started and was booked. Sometimes referred to as "Nasty" due to his fiery nature and tendency for cautions, he was primarily signed to replace the outgoing Robbie Savage, and finished the season strongly, which led to a permanent deal being agreed in the summer.

Nafti's 2005–06 campaign came to end before it had even begun, with a severe injury to his cruciate ligaments in a friendly with Deportivo La Coruña in early August 2005. He recovered sooner than expected, and was able to start the last match of the season, a 1–0 loss at Bolton Wanderers, with relegation already confirmed.

After having appeared in 32 games in 2006–07 to help Birmingham return to the top division, Nafti scored his first goal for them on 13 August 2008, in a 4–0 win against Wycombe Wanderers in the 2008–09 League Cup. In June 2009, after the club chose not to renew his contract, he signed a two-year deal with Aris Thessaloniki in Greece.

On 12 September 2009, Nafti scored the only goal of the home match against PAS Giannina to put Aris top of the Superleague Greece after three matches. He finished his debut season with four goals from 22 league games, as Aris finished fifth.

During the January 2011 transfer window, the 32-year-old Nafti left Aris and returned to Spain, signing an 18-month contract with Segunda División club Real Valladolid. He spent the 2012–13 season with Real Murcia, helping them avoid relegation from the second tier, and had considered retiring from the game before dropping down a division to sign for Cádiz. He established himself in the latter team but was also troubled by injury, and after they signed midfielder Jon Ander Garrido in the January 2014 transfer window, Nafti's contract was cancelled.

International
A Tunisia international since 2002, Nafti represented the nation in three Africa Cup of Nations tournaments, helping it win the 2004 edition played on home soil. He then appeared in the 2005 FIFA Confederations Cup, playing against Australia (2–0 win) and Germany (3–0 loss).

Nafti was selected for the squad that competed in the 2006 FIFA World Cup in Germany, appearing in all three matches as Tunisia exited in the group stage. The previous 4 June, he scored his only international goal to equalise in a 3–1 qualifying win away to Botswana.

Coaching career
On 10 June 2016, Nafti was given his first managerial job, at Segunda División B club Marbella FC, despite reportedly not possessing the licence required to manage at that level. After a series of poor results, he was fired on 7 March 2017.

Nafti was hired by another Segunda B club, Mérida AD, on 27 June 2017; he lasted until 20 December. The following 12 March, after the resignation of his successor, Loren, he returned to the Estadio Romano as manager, but left at the end of the season after failing to prevent their relegation.

In October 2018, Nafti took over as manager of CD Badajoz, also of the third division, until the end of the season. In the 2019–20 season, his team eliminated UD Las Palmas (second tier) and SD Eibar (top flight) from the Copa del Rey before an extra-time loss to Granada CF in the last 16. He was dismissed on 4 February 2020 with the team fourth in the league.

On 9 October 2020, Nafti was announced as manager of Étoile Sportive du Sahel in his home nation, but returned to Spain five days later, after being appointed in charge of second division side CD Lugo. He was sacked from the latter club the following 28 February, after a 1–4 loss to UD Almería.

Nafti replaced sacked Asier Garitano at the helm of CD Leganés, also in the Spanish second division, on 31 October 2021. He left the following 5 June, as his contract would not be renewed.
 
A week after leaving Leganés, Nafti signed a one-year contract with newly relegated Levante UD. He was sacked on 10 October 2022, having won twice and taken ten points from nine games.

On 2 January 2023, Nafti was hired to replace Hussein Ammouta as manager of African champions Wydad AC of Morocco. His debut three days later in the Botola was a 2–1 loss at SCC Mohammédia. The following month he led the club at the 2022 FIFA Club World Cup on home soil, being eliminated in their first match by Al Hilal SFC on penalties.
On February 26th 2023, he was fired by President Saïd Naciri after his catastrophic results with Wydad AC.
Apparently he was not aware that he was the manager of Africa's champions.

Playing statistics

Club

International
Source:

|}

Managerial statistics

Honours
Tunisia
 Africa Cup of Nations: 2004

References

External links
 

1978 births
Living people
French sportspeople of Tunisian descent
Footballers from Toulouse
Tunisian footballers
Tunisia international footballers
Association football midfielders
Ligue 1 players
Ligue 2 players
Toulouse FC players
La Liga players
Segunda División players
Segunda División B players
Rayo Cantabria players
Racing de Santander players
Real Valladolid players
Real Murcia players
Cádiz CF players
Premier League players
English Football League players
Birmingham City F.C. players
Super League Greece players
Aris Thessaloniki F.C. players
2005 FIFA Confederations Cup players
2006 FIFA World Cup players
2002 African Cup of Nations players
2004 African Cup of Nations players
2008 Africa Cup of Nations players
Tunisian expatriate footballers
Expatriate footballers in Spain
Tunisian expatriate sportspeople in Spain
Expatriate footballers in England
Tunisian expatriate sportspeople in England
Expatriate footballers in Greece
Tunisian expatriate sportspeople in Greece
Tunisian football managers
Segunda División B managers
Segunda División managers
Marbella FC managers
CD Badajoz managers
Étoile Sportive du Sahel managers
CD Lugo managers
CD Leganés managers
Levante UD managers
Wydad AC managers
Botola managers
Tunisian expatriate football managers
Tunisian expatriate sportspeople in Morocco
Expatriate football managers in Spain
Expatriate football managers in Morocco